Kim Taeyong (born 1974) is a South Korean writer.

Life 

Kim Taeyong was born in Seoul in 1974. He graduated in creative writing from Soongsil University. He began his literary career when his short story “Oreunjjogeseo sebeonjjae jip” (오른쪽에서 세 번째 집 The Third House from the Right) was published in the 2005 spring issue of the quarterly literary magazine Segyeuimunhak. He has won the Hankook Ilbo Literary Award, Moonji Literary Award, KimHyun Literary Award.

Writing 

Kim Taeyong's works are weird and grotesque. The title story of his first collection, “Pulbat wiui dwaeji” (풀밭 위의 돼지 The Pig on the Grass), has a scene where a wife, a husband, and a pig are lying next to one another on the grass. The pig then jumps over the husband's body and goes next to the wife. The wife does not show that she dislikes this. Such depiction of the wife, the husband, and the pig lying and tangled on the grass, evokes strange sexual tension, while also deconstructing the traditional family narrative that focuses on ‘relationships’.

Such deconstruction of traditional narratives comes from Kim Taeyong's perspective on writing. Many of Kim Taeyong's stories are about writing itself. In the title story of his second collection “Poju iyagi” (포주 이야기 A Pimp's Story), the pimp, who is the narrator, starts writing a will with the sentence ‘I was a pimp’, and struggles to write the next sentence. The incapable pimp is the alter ego of the writer. The narrator who used to be a pimp, goes under inner conflict after learning how to write from a university student who had come out as a volunteer for the elderly with not relatives. The narrator had never even had the desire to think about the meaning of his life as a pimp before learning to write. He confesses that “as I write, I feel that my sin is getting bigger, and heavier. The history of more and more wicked sins concealed among the words is torturing me. Strangely, I cannot stop. I feel that I am getting further from my memories as I am calling upon them to write.” Such distrust he has for writing can also stand for the distrust that the author has for writing.

Kim Taeyong's distrust for writing gives rise to a unique form of a repetition of sentences that deconstruct the meaning of the sentence that comes before each one. This is a prominent characteristic of Kim Taeyong's works, where a clear narrative is not given, there are repetition of the same word and gaps that intentionally damage the story's context, as well as writing that reconstructs the meaning of a word, or give it no meaning.

Works 
 Eumak ijeonui chaek (음악 이전의 책 A book before music), 2018
 Beolgeosung-ideul (벌거숭이들 The Naked), 2014. 
 Poju iyagi  (포주 이야기 A Pimp's Story), 2012. 
 Sumgimeopsi namgimeopsi (숨김없이 남김없이 Without Hiding, Without a Trace), 2010.
 Pulbat wiui dwaeji (풀밭 위의 돼지 The Pig on the Grass), 2007.

Works in translation 
 J'étais un maquereau (French)

Awards 
 Hankook Ilbo Literary Award, 2008.
 Moonji Literary Award, 2012. 
 KimHyun Literary Award, 2016.

References 

 

1974 births
Living people
South Korean writers